Novica Marojević (born 11 April 1973) is a Montenegrin footballer who played for various clubs in his native country Yugoslavia and in the United States.

Playing career
While in the U.S., Novi played for the Rochester Raging Rhinos, Kansas City Attack, Chicago Storm, Chicago Riot and Detroit Ignition, in the United States.

Managerial career
Novi took over as coach for Chicago Soul in December 2012 and currently coaches one of the youth soccer teams in the Midwest, Indiana Elite in Crown Point, Indiana. In 2017, Novi started construction of a 1.5 million dollar soccer complex project in Portage. In 2021, Indiana Elite was one of the 3 teams that joined the ECNL league for the 2021-2022 season. Between 2004 - 2006, Novi coached Christian Pulisic.

Personal life
Born in Nikšić, Novi came to the United States in 1996. He is married to Jadranka Marojević and they have a son called Marko.

References

External links
 Profile . ONE OF A KIND SOCCER PLAY
Sponsored by Adidas

1973 births
Footballers from Nikšić
Association football midfielders
Serbia and Montenegro footballers
Montenegrin footballers
FK Sutjeska Nikšić players
FK Radnički Niš players
FK Voždovac players
FK Čelik Nikšić players
Chicago Storm players
Detroit Ignition players
Eastern Indoor Soccer League players
Major Indoor Soccer League (2001–2008) players
Serbia and Montenegro expatriate footballers
Montenegrin expatriate footballers
Expatriate soccer players in the United States
Serbia and Montenegro expatriate sportspeople in the United States
Montenegrin expatriate sportspeople in the United States
Soccer coaches in the United States
Living people